"Clara veut la Lune" (Clara wants the Moon) is the third single from the album Elles & Lui by the French singer Alain Chamfort featuring French recording artist Alizée. The single is a re-release of the same song in celebration of Chamfort's career.

Composition 
"Clara veut la Lune" contains the same lyric as the original song but with a very Electro rhythm style of music, referring to the more powerful tone of the earlier and the lighter vocal touch of the latter version. The song was produced by Olivier Schulteis, Jean-pierre Pilot and William Rousseau, and written by Alain Chamfort and Jacques Duvall.

Release history

See also
Alain Chamfort

2012 singles
Alizée songs
Fontana Records singles
2012 songs